Arrel R. Olaño (born May 3, 1943 in Tagum City, Davao del Norte, Philippines), is a Filipino politician. A member of the LAKAS-CMD Party, he has been elected to three terms as a Member of the House of Representatives of the Philippines, representing the First District of Davao del Norte. First elected in 2001, he was re-elected in 2004 and 2007.  Olaño is also a certified public accountant.

References

 
 

People from Tagum
1943 births
Living people
Lakas–CMD (1991) politicians
Members of the House of Representatives of the Philippines from Davao del Norte
Filipino accountants